Juan C. Bonilla Municipality is a municipality in Puebla in south-eastern Mexico. It is named after Juan Crisóstomo Bonilla.

References

Municipalities of Puebla